Unefon is a Mexican mobile telecommunications brand used by AT&T Mexico, a subsidiary of AT&T Inc., used for prepaid products. The company was partially owned by Grupo Salinas and Mexican media group Televisa, and its network was CDMA only, using no analog base stations.

Starting 2010, Unefon started to use GSM technology and started sharing Iusacell stations and network.

Telecommunications companies of Mexico
Mobile phone companies of Mexico
AT&T subsidiaries